The national flag of Hungary is a horizontal tricolour of red, white and green (red-white-green). In this exact form, it has been the official flag of Hungary since 23 May 1957. The flag's form  originates from national republican movements of the 18th and 19th centuries, while its colours are from the Middle Ages. The current Hungarian tricolour flag is the same as the republican movement flag of the United Kingdom (used since 1816) and the colours in that form were already used at least since the coronation of Leopold II in 1790, predating the first use of the Italian Tricolour in 1797.

The flag of Iran is similar to the Hungarian flag, except for the presence of religious symbols, and the red and green stripes are inverted.

Current flag
The modern flag of Hungary originated from the national freedom movement from before 1848, which culminated in the Hungarian Revolution of 1848. The revolution was not only in opposition against the monarchy but also the Habsburg Empire, as well as to form an independent republic. Accordingly, the Hungarian flag features a tricolour element, which is based upon the French flag, as a reflection of the ideas of the French revolution; while red, white, and green are colours derived from the historical Hungarian coat of arms, which have essentially remained in the same form since the mid-15th century, with exception to some minor differences, and were marshalled from arms that first appeared in the late 12th and early 13th century as arms of the Árpáds, Hungary's founding dynasty. The stripes are horizontal rather than vertical to prevent confusion with the Italian flag despite the banner in that form predating the Italian tricolour by at least 7 years but unlike in Italy, the Italians adopted it as the flag of an Italian state in 1797. According to other data, but no evidence of, the recent form of the Hungarian tricolour had been already used from 1608 at the coronation of Mathias II of Hungary and following coronations.
Folklore of the romantic period attributed the colours to virtues: red for strength, white for faithfulness and green for hope. Alternatively, red for the blood spilled for the fatherland, white for freedom and green for the land, for the pastures of Hungary. The new constitution, which took effect on 1 January 2012, makes the ex-post interpretation mentioned first official (in the semi-official translation: strength (erő), fidelity (hűség) and hope (remény)).

Evolution

As described above, the red, white and green tricolour clearly emerged as a sign of national sovereignty during the 1848–1849 revolution against the Habsburgs. Hungarian volunteers and Émigrés fought for the social movement and wars of Italian unification under the banner for Garibaldi.  After the revolution in Hungary was defeated, the tricolour flag was prohibited by the Austrian Emperor. After the Compromise of 1867, however, the tricolour became not only legal, but also the official flag of Hungary. The flag had the so-called minor arms  (also known as the Kossuth coat of arms) of Hungary with archangels as supporters were used as a badge on the flag. This configuration was used until the end of the Habsburg Empire in 1918.

After the fall of the Habsburg Empire, the years 1918 to 1920 were highly turbulent, and several hard-to-trace minor changes took place. The red-green-white tricolour stayed the same, but small differences emerged in terms of the badge. A short interlude and exception was the 1919 Hungarian Soviet Republic, which lasted for four-and-a-half months; it used a solid red banner.

It seems that from 1920 to 1944–1945 the tricolour displayed the minor arms of Hungary, but the version without them was also used.

Between 1946 and 1949 the crown was removed from the top of the arms serving as the badge.

With the onset of Communist rule in 1949, a new coat of arms featuring a Communist red star was placed on the flag as the badge.

During the anti-Soviet uprising in 1956, revolutionaries cut out the Hammer and Wheat emblem and used the resulting tricolour with a hole in the middle as the symbol of the revolution. For some months the new government changed the flag to bear the minor arms without the crown as the badge again.

In 1957, after the revolution was defeated by the Soviet Red Army, the new government created a "new" coat of arms, which however was never officially put onto the flag. Therefore, the official flag of Hungary has been a pure red-white-green tricolour since 1957.

After the fall of communism in 1989 there was no need to change the flag, as like the flags of Poland and Czechoslovakia, it did not bear any communist insignia.

There was a recommendation of the Committee of Symbols in the 2000s, that the coat of arms should be part of the state flag, while the national flag should remain plain (as is the status quo). This has not been implemented in law, though in case of most state use the arms are legally permitted on the flag (see below).

Exact description and legislature
The Hungarian Constitution does not explicitly state anything about the width:length ratio of the flag; but, there is a law from 1957 that is in force stating that seagoing merchant vessels shall hoist the red, white and green tricolour in 2:3 ratio.

By a government decree from 2000, the ratio (which is neither defined in the Constitution nor in 1995 or 2000 legislation) of flags used on government building is 1:2.

Summarized, this would mean:
  A red–white–green tricolour. Actually many variations might be used though according to 1995/LXXXIII §11 (3) "(3) In cases specified in paragraphs (1) and (2), the arms and the flag can be used also in their historical forms.", as (1) reads as: 1995/LXXXIII §11 (1) "(1) For the purpose of declaring their belonging to the nation, private persons can use the arms and the flag, subject to the limitations in this law."
  red–white–green tricolour, ratio 1:2 (by decree from 2000). According to 1995/LXXXIII §11 (4), the official coat of arms of Hungary might be placed onto it as a badge.
  White background with green red alternated flammulette ("flame tongues", triangles with wavy edge) border, coat of arms in the center, embraced by oak branches from the left, olive branches from the right. Ratio not defined. ( 1995/LXXXIII §8 (1) )
  2:3 (ratio defined by 1957 law) red-white-green tricolour (there is a merchant fleet)
  Unknown or unspecified;
  White background with green red alternated triangle border, coat of arms at 1/3 of the flag, nearer to the pole. Ratio not defined. ( 1995/LXXXIII §8 (2) )

Colours
The colours of the flag of Hungary are defined in the official document MSZ 1361:2009:

Gallery

Historical flags

Head of state standards

See also

 List of Hungarian flags
 Flags of Hungarian history
 Coat of arms of Hungary
 Himnusz

Notes

References

External links

 
 Flag of Hungary at www.rbvex.it
 2011 CCII law (on the use of Hungary's coat of arms and flag, as well as awards) from njt.hu

Hungary
Hungary
National symbols of Hungary
Hungary